Padmini, Sanskrit for "She who sits on the lotus", a reference to the Hindu goddess Lakshmi, may refer to:

People

Given name
 Rani Padmini (fl. 13th/14th centuries), Rani of the Mewar kingdom
 Padmini (actress) (1932–2006), Indian actress and Bharathanatyam dancer
 Padmini Chettur (born 1970), Indian dancer
 Padmini Devi (born 1943), titular Rajmata of Jaipur, India
 Padmini Dian (born 1986), Indian politician
 Padmini Kolhapure (born 1965), Indian actress and singer
 Padmini Murthy, Indian-American physician
 Padmini Prakash, Indian news anchor, actress, and transgender rights activist
 Padmini Priyadarshini (1944–2016), Indian actress, dancer and choreographer
 Padmini Rout (born 1994), Indian chess player
 Padmini Swaminathan, Indian feminist economist
 Padmini Thomas, Indian track athlete

Surname
 Divya Padmini, Indian actress
 Kumari Padmini (died 1980), Indian actress
 Kutty Padmini (born 1956), Indian actress
 Rani Padmini (actress) (1962–1986), Indian actress
 T. K. Padmini (1940–1969), Indian painter

Other uses
 Padmini (film), an Indian Malayalam-language biographical film about T. K. Padmini
 Premier Padmini, an automobile manufactured in India 1964–2001
 Padmini Pictures, an Indian film production company cofounded by B. R. Panthulu

See also